John de Courcy, 21st Baron Kingsale (died 1667) sat in the House of Lords of the Irish Parliament of 1661–1666.

Birth and origins 

John was born the eldest son of Patrick de Courcy and Mary FitzGerald. His father was the 20th Baron Kingsale (also counted as the 19th or the 15th). His father's family, the de Courcys, were Old English and claimed descendence from John de Courcy, who had arrived in Ireland in 1176.

His mother was a daughter of John Oge FitzGerald of Dromana. Her eldest sister, Helen (or Ellen) was the wife of his uncle Gerald, the 19th Baron Kingsale. The FitzGeralds of Dromana were Old English like the de Courcys. They were a cadet branch of the FitzGeralds of Desmond that started when Gerald FitzGerald, the second son of James FitzGerald, 6th Earl of Desmond (d. 1462) was given Dromana as an appanage.

His parents married when his father was already 48 years old but had 23 children. However, only seven seem to be known by name.

Early life 
His father was Baron Kingsale from about 1642 to 1663, during the 11 years of war that followed the Irish Rebellion of 1641, then through the eight years of Cromwellian rule in Ireland, and last through the Restoration.

Marriage and children 
De Courcy married Ellen, daughter of Charles MacCarthy Reagh of Kilbrittain and granddaughter of Donal MacCarthy Reagh of Kilbrittain.

 
John and Ellen had three sons:
 Patrick (1660–1669), succeeded as the 22nd Baron
 Almeric (1664–1720), succeeded as the 23rd Baron
 William

—and at least one daughter:
 Ellen, married Sir John Magrath, 3rd Baronet

21st Baron 
John succeeded his father in 1663 as the 21st Baron Kingsale. He took his seat in the Irish House of Lords as Lord Kingsale on 9 November 1665.

Death 
Kingsale died of smallpox on 19 May 1667. He was succeeded by his eldest son Patrick aged seven.

Notes and references

Notes

Citations

Sources 

 
 
  – G to K (for Kingsale)
  – 1625 to 1649 (for Magrath)
  – Hussey to Lincolnshire
 
 
  – Viscounts, barons
  – Normans, English, Huguenots etc.

1664 births
1720 deaths
17th-century Irish people
18th-century Irish people
Barons in the Peerage of Ireland
Burials at Westminster Abbey
Irish Jacobites
Irish people of French descent
Irish soldiers in the army of James II of England
Members of the Irish House of Lords
Politicians from County Cork
Politicians from County Dublin